Jebel Irhoud or Adrar n Ighoud, is an archaeological site located just north of the locality known as Tlet Ighoud, approximately  south-east of the city of Safi in Morocco. It is noted for the hominin fossils that have been found there since the discovery of the site in 1960. Originally thought to be Neanderthals, the specimens have since been assigned to Homo sapiens and, as reported in 2017, have been dated to roughly 300,000 years ago ( for the Irhoud 3 mandible,  based on other fossils and the flint artefacts found nearby).

Site 
It was discovered in 1961 when the area was being mined for the mineral baryte. A miner discovered a skull in the wall of the cave, extracted it, and gave it to an engineer, who kept it as a souvenir for a time. Eventually, it was handed over to the University of Rabat, which organized a joint French-Moroccan expedition to the site that was headed by anthropologist Émile Ennouchi.

Ennouchi's team identified the remains of approximately 30 species of mammals, some of which are associated with the Middle Pleistocene, but the stratigraphic provenance is unknown. Another excavation was carried out by Jacques Tixier and Roger de Bayle des Hermens in 1967 and 1969, during which 22 layers were identified in the cave. The lower 13 layers were found to contain signs of human habitation including a tool industry classified as Levallois Mousterian.

Human remains
The site is particularly noted for the hominin fossils found there. Ennouchi discovered a skull that he termed Irhoud 1. It is now on display in the Rabat Archaeological Museum. He discovered part of another skull, designated Irhoud 2, the following year and subsequently uncovered the lower mandible of a child, designated Irhoud 3. Tixier's excavation found 1,267 recorded objects including skulls, a humerus designated Irhoud 4, and a hip bone recorded as Irhoud 5.

Further excavations were carried out by American researchers during the 1990s as well as by a team led by Jean-Jacques Hublin from 2004. Animal remains found at the site have enabled the ancient ecology of the area to be reconstructed. It was quite different to the present and probably represented a dry, open, and perhaps, steppe-like environment roamed by equids, bovids, gazelles, rhinoceros, and various predators.

Dating 

Initially, the finds were interpreted as Neanderthal, as the stone tools found with them were believed to be associated exclusively with Neanderthals. They also had archaic phenotypical features believed to be representative of the Neanderthals, rather than Homo sapiens. They were thought to be approximately 40,000 years old, but this was thrown into doubt by faunal evidence suggesting a Middle Pleistocene date, approximately 160,000 years ago. Because of that, the fossils were reappraised as representing an archaic form of Homo sapiens or perhaps a population of Homo sapiens that had interbred with Neanderthals. This was consistent with the concept that the then-oldest-known remains of a Homo sapiens, dated to approximately 195,000 years ago and found in Omo Kibish, Ethiopia, indicated an eastern African origin for humans at approximately 200,000 years ago. The Ethiopian Omo remains were more recently dated to about 233,000 years old.

However, dating carried out by the Max Planck Institute for Evolutionary Anthropology in Leipzig revealed that the Jebel Irhoud site was far older than first thought. Fresh excavations carried out in 2004 by the Hublin team revealed more than 20 new bones from the remains of at least five people, and a number of stone tools. The finds included part of a skull, a jawbone, teeth, and limb bones that had come from three adults, a juvenile, and a child aged about seven-and-a-half years old. The facial bones resembled those of humans today, but had much larger lower jaws and more elongated posterior braincases. They have similar features to the Florisbad Skull dating to 260,000 years ago found at the other end of the continent, in Florisbad, South Africa, which now has been attributed to Homo sapiens on the basis of the Jebel Irhoud finds.

The tools discovered were found alongside gazelle bones and lumps of charcoal, indicating the presence of fire and, probably, of cooking in the cave. The gazelle bones showed characteristic signs of butchery and cooking, such as cut marks, notches consistent with marrow extraction, and charring. Some of the tools had been burned due to fires being lit on top of them, presumably after they had been discarded. This enabled the researchers to use thermoluminescence dating to ascertain when the burning occurred, and by proxy, the age of the fossil bones that were found in the same deposit layer.

In 2017, the burnt tools were dated to approximately 315,000 years ago, indicating that the fossils are of approximately the same age. This conclusion was confirmed by recalculating the age of the Irhoud 3 mandible, which produced an age range compatible with that of the tools, at roughly 280,000 to 350,000 years old. If they hold up, these dates would make the remains by far the earliest known examples of Homo sapiens.

This suggests that, rather than arising in East Africa approximately 200,000 years ago, modern humans may have been present across the length of Africa 100,000 years earlier. According to study author Jean-Jacques Hublin, "The idea is that early Homo sapiens dispersed around the continent and elements of human modernity appeared in different places, and so different parts of Africa contributed to the emergence of what we call modern humans today." Early humans may have comprised a large, interbreeding population dispersed across Africa approximately 330,000 to 300,000 years ago. Thus, the rise of modern humans may have taken place on a continental scale rather than being confined to a particular corner of Africa.

Hublin and his team also attempted to obtain DNA samples from these fossils, but these attempts were unsuccessful. Genomic analysis would have provided necessary evidence supporting the conclusion that these fossils are representative of the main lineage leading up to modern humanity, and that Homo sapiens had dispersed and developed all across Africa. Because of the unclear boundaries between different species of the genus Homo, and the lack of genomic evidence from these fossils, some doubt the classification of these fossils as Homo sapiens. Questions remain over the classification of these fossils.

Morphology

When comparing these fossils with those of modern humans, the main difference is the elongated shape of the fossil braincase. According to the researchers, this indicates that brain shape, and possibly brain functions, evolved within the Homo sapiens lineage and relatively recently. Evolutionary changes in brain shape are likely to be associated with genetic changes of brain organization, interconnection, and development, and may reflect adaptive changes in the way the brain functions. Such changes may have caused the human brain to become rounder and two regions in the posterior of the brain to become enlarged during thousands of years of evolution.
The Jebel Irhoud individuals also had very thick brow ridges and lacked prognathism.

The degree of tooth development found is similar to modern European children of the same age, but teeth roots develop faster than for modern humans (and slower than for apes and for some other fossil hominids). Tooth crowns took a longer time to form than in modern humans.

While the Jebel Irhoud specimens originally were noted to have been similar to later Aterian and Iberomaurusian specimens, further examinations revealed that the Jebel Irhoud specimens differ from them in that they have a continuous supraorbital torus while the Aterian and Iberomaurasian specimens have a discontinuous supraorbital torus or, in some cases, none at all, and from this, it was concluded that the Jebel Irhoud specimens represent archaic Homo sapiens while the Aterian and Iberomaurasian specimens represent anatomically modern Homo sapiens. Despite this, it was noted that the Jebel Irhoud specimen whose cranium was complete enough to assess, showed "hints of 'modern' basicranial flexion in the relationship of the face and vault", and the teeth of another Jebel Irhoud specimen were subjected to synchrotron analysis that suggested "a modern developmental pattern."

See also 

 Fossil
 List of fossil sites (with link directory)
 List of human evolution fossils (with images)
 List of transitional fossils

References

External links 
 Article at PhysOrg.com
 The Guardian: 160,000-year-old jawbone redefines origins of the species
 The New York Times: Oldest Fossil of Homo sapiens Found in Morocco, Altering History of Our Species
 National Geographic: These Early Humans Lived 300,000 Years Ago—But Had Modern Faces

1960 archaeological discoveries
2017 in Morocco
2017 in paleontology
Archaeological sites in Morocco
Caves of Morocco
Human evolution
Paleoanthropological sites
Pleistocene paleontological sites of Africa
Mousterian